Zardan (also Romanized as Zardān; also known as Zowrdān, Zardāb, Zardāh, and Zardow) is a village in Afin Rural District, Zohan District, Zirkuh County, South Khorasan Province, Iran. At the 2006 census, its population was 157, in 41 families.

References 

Populated places in Zirkuh County